Glenn William "GT" Thompson Jr. (born July 27, 1959) is an American politician serving as the U.S. representative for  since 2019. A member of the Republican Party, he was first elected to Congress in 2008 for the state's 5th congressional district; Thompson was redistricted to the 15th congressional district in the 2018 election by an order of the Supreme Court of Pennsylvania. Since 2023, he has chaired the House Agriculture Committee.

Early life, education and early career

Thompson was born in Bellefonte, Pennsylvania, grew up in Howard, Pennsylvania, and is the son of a Navy veteran. He holds a bachelor's degree in therapeutic recreation from Pennsylvania State University and dual master's degrees in therapeutic recreation and health science from Temple University.

Thompson worked for 28 years as a Therapist/Rehab Services Manager/Licensed Nursing Home Administrator in Lycoming County and chaired the Centre County Republican Committee for six years. He has spent 25 years as a member or president of the Howard Volunteer Fire Company 14, and volunteers as a firefighter, emergency medical technician, and rescue technician.

U.S. House of Representatives

Tenure

When the 112th Congress convened on January 5, 2011, to elect a Speaker of the United States House of Representatives, Thompson's vote was the 218th vote for John Boehner, giving Boehner the majority needed to be named Speaker.

During the 112th Congress, Thompson became chairman of the House Agriculture Subcommittee on Forestry, Conservation, and Energy.

At the start of the 115th Congress, Thompson was named vice-chairman of the House Committee on Agriculture. In December 2020, ahead of the 117th Congress, he was named ranking member of the agriculture committee.

Government funding
In January 2018, Thompson voted for the Fiscal Year 2018 continuing resolution (CR), a stopgap funding bill to fund the federal government at then-current levels through February 16, 2018. It also provided for six-year funding for the Children's Health Insurance Program (CHIP). Thompson praised the measure for delaying what he called "three onerous and unpopular Obamacare taxes, which should be permanently repealed."

Education
As a member of the House Education and Workforce Committee, Thompson has supported local control rather than federal mandates on issues like evaluating teachers, opposed private school vouchers, and voted to expand S-CHIP (children's health insurance). In August 2014, the National Education Association's political action committee endorsed Thompson for reelection.

Food programs
In April 2018, Thompson supported new work and job training requirements for certain beneficiaries of the Supplemental Nutrition Assistance Program (SNAP), or food stamps. Thompson spoke up for the federal Special Supplemental Nutrition Program for Women, Infants, and Children (WIC), recalling that in the early 1980s, when he earned "less than $9,000", he and his wife had relied upon WIC, "a short-term intervention program designed to help pregnant women and their children meet healthy nutritional needs."

Gun control

After the Stoneman Douglas High School shooting in 2018, Thompson told an audience of students that he did not agree with the idea of arming teachers and had voted to fund an improved national background check system. Thompson called for more "uniformed law enforcement in our schools."

Veterans
In April 2017, Thompson and Julia Brownley introduced H.R. 2123, the Veterans E-Health and Telemedicine Support (VETS) Act of 2017. In September, Thompson praised the Department of Veterans Affairs for proposing a rule that was similar to his bill that would allow VA-credentialed health care providers to practice telemedicine across state lines.

Thompson sponsored the Servicemembers' Telemedicine and E-Health Portability Act of 2011, which was enacted as part of the National Defense Authorization Act for Fiscal Year 2012. The bill expanded the use of telemedicine for active duty military, reserve and National Guard.

Environment
Of climate change, Thompson has said, "I think humans contribute," but added that he was not sure of the degree to which they contribute. In September 2017, Thompson and several other members of Congress asked the Environmental Protection Agency (EPA) and U.S. Army Corps of Engineers to rescind the Waters of the United States rule, calling the regulation an overreach that expanded "EPA's authority far beyond its congressional mandate."

Rural air service
In April 2018, Thompson fought efforts to eliminate federal funding for the Essential Air Service. Three airports in his district participate in it.

Texas v. Pennsylvania
In December 2020, Thompson was one of 126 Republican members of the House of Representatives to sign an amicus brief in support of Texas v. Pennsylvania, a lawsuit filed at the United States Supreme Court contesting the results of the 2020 presidential election, in which Joe Biden defeated incumbent Donald Trump. The Supreme Court declined to hear the case on the basis that Texas lacked standing under Article III of the Constitution to challenge the results of an election held by another state.

Marriage rights 
In July 2022, Thompson voted against the Respect for Marriage Act, which would codify the right to same-sex marriage, just days before attending his son's same-sex wedding.

Committee assignments
 Committee on Agriculture (Chair)
 Subcommittee on General Farm Commodities and Risk Management
 Subcommittee on Biotechnology, Horticulture, and Research
Subcommittee on Livestock and Foreign Agriculture
 Committee on Education and Labor
Subcommittee on Civil Rights and Human Services
 Subcommittee on Early Childhood, Elementary and Secondary Education

Caucus leadership
 Past National Co-chair, Congressional High School Art Competition
 German-American Caucus (co-chair)
 Congressional Natural Gas Caucus (co-chair)
 Career and Technical Education Caucus (co-chair)
 Congressional Constitution Caucus
Coal Caucus
House Baltic Caucus
Congressional Arts Caucus
Congressional Western Caucus
Veterinary Medicine Caucus
Republican Governance Group

Elections

2008

2010

Thompson defeated Democratic nominee Michael Pipe, 69%–28%.

2012

Thompson defeated Democratic nominee Charles Dumas, 63%–37%.

2014

Thompson defeated Democratic nominee Kerith Strano Taylor, 64%–36%.

2016

Thompson defeated Taylor again, 67%–33%.

2018

After the Pennsylvania Supreme Court redrew the congressional district map in February 2018, Thompson's district was renumbered the 15th. In May 2018, Susan Boser, a professor at Indiana University of Pennsylvania, won the Democratic nomination in Thompson's district, defeating Wade Johun in her party's primary. In the general election, Thompson defeated Boser, 68%–32%.

2020

Thomson defeated Democratic nominee Robert Williams, 73.5%–26.5%.

2022

Thomson defeated the Democratic nominee, Lewisburg Borough Council Member Mike Molesevich, 70%–30%.

References

External links
 
 Congressman Glenn Thompson official U.S. House website
 Friends of Glenn Thompson campaign website
 
 
 

|-

|-

|-

1959 births
21st-century American politicians
American firefighters
American Protestants
Emergency medical technicians
Living people
People from Bellefonte, Pennsylvania
People from Centre County, Pennsylvania
Pennsylvania State University alumni
Republican Party members of the United States House of Representatives from Pennsylvania
School board members in Pennsylvania
Temple University alumni